Woodlands High School may refer to:
The Woodlands High School in The Woodlands, Texas
Woodlands High School (New York)